Bazinaprine (SR-95,191) is an experimental drug candidate. It is a monoamine oxidase inhibitor (MAOI) which is believed to be useful for the treatment of depression. The drug strongly inhibits type A monoamine oxidase, but only weakly inhibits type B. The effects of the drug are reversible in vivo, but not in vitro.  In studies, the chemical has been shown to not interact in vivo with other neurotransmitter or drug receptor sites.

See also 
 Reversible inhibitor of MAO-A (RIMA)

References 

Monoamine oxidase inhibitors
4-Morpholinyl compunds
Nitriles
Pyridazines